Okpekpe road race is an annual event in Edo State, Nigeria. It is a 10 Kilometre road race over hills and tarred roads, starting from Apana Road and ending in Okpekpe town. The 2018 edition of the race featured participants from Kenya, Eritrea, Ethiopia, Uganda, Morocco, Israel, Bahrain, Morocco  and Nigeria. Kenyan Kibet Alex won the men’s category of the 2018 edition of the race with a finishing time of  29 minutes 46 seconds. Simon Chepat was second with a finishing of 30 minutes 29 seconds and Ronoh Timothy placed third with a finishing time of 30 minutes 39 seconds. Yani Dera Dida won the female category.

The International Association of Athletics Federations (IAAF) silver labelled the Okpekpe international 10km road race.

Past winners

References

External links 
 

Running in Nigeria